Hédi André Bouraoui  (born July 16, 1932 in Sfax, Tunisia) is a Tunisian/Canadian poet, novelist and academic, who regularly deals with themes involving the transcendence of cultural boundaries.

Bouraoui was educated in France and in the United States, in French, English and American literature. In 1966, he joined the faculty at York University in Toronto, Ontario, where he teaches both French and English literature, specializing in African, Caribbean and franco-ontarian literatures. He also launched the Canada-Mediterranean Centre (CMC) at the university.

In May 2003, he was granted an honorary doctorate from Laurentian University in Sudbury, Ontario, in recognition of his contributions to Canadian and world literature. He has also received a number of literary awards in Canada, France, and Tunisia.

In 2018, he was named a member of the Order of Canada.

Published works

Novels
 L'Icônaison, 1985 
 Bangkok Blues, 1994 
 Retour à Thyna, 1996 
 La Pharaone, 1998 
 Ainsi parle la Tour CN, 1999 
 La Composée, 2001 
 La Femme d'entre les lignes, 2002 
 Sept Portes pour une Brûlance, 2005 
 Puglia à bras ouverts, 2007 
 Cap Nord, 2008 
 Les aléas d'une odyssée, 2009 
 Méditerranée à voile toute, 2010
 Le Conteur, 2012
 La Plantée, 2017

Poetry
 Musocktail, 1966
 Tremblé, 1969
 Eclate-Module, 1972
 Vésuviade, 1976 
 Haïtuvois, suivi de Antillades, 1980 
 Tales of Heritage I, 1981 
 Vers et l'Envers, 1982 
 Ignescent, 1982 
 Tales of Heritage II, 1986 
 Echosmos, 1986  or 
 Reflet Pluriel, 1986
 Emergent les Branches, 1986
 Arc-en-Terre, 1991 
 Poésies, 1991
 Emigressence, 1992 
 Nomadaime, 1995 
 Transvivance, 1996
 L'Ange perVers, 1998
 Illuminations Autistes, 2003 
 Struga, suivi de Margelle d'un festival, 2004 
 Sfaxitude, 2005
 Livr'Errance, 2005
 In-side Faces/ Visages du Dedans, 2008 
 Adamesques, 2009

Essays
 Créaculture I, 1971
 Créaculture II, 1971
 The Canadian Alternative, 1980 
 Critical Strategy, 1983 
 La Francophonie à l'Estomac, 1995 
 La Littérature franco-ontarienne. Etat des lieux, 2000 
 Pierre Léon: Poète de l'Humour, 2003 
 Transpoétique: Éloge du Nomadisme, 2005 
 Perspectives sur la littérature franco-ontarienne, 2007
 Vingt-quatre heures en tesselles mosaïcales, 2018

Honours and awards

Honours
 2019 : Member of the Order of Canada
 2010 : Honorary citizenship of Acquaviva delle Fonti
 2004 : Officier of the Ordre des Palmes Académiques (France) 
 1993 : Medal of the Regional Council of Guadeloupe

Awards
 2005 : Prize for the best scholarly book, awarded by the Association of French Professors of Canadian Universities and Colleges
 2000 : Africa Mediterranean / Maghreb Award
 2000 : Christine Dumitriu Van Saanen Award
 1999 : Comar d'or
 1999 : Ontario Award
 1999 : Jean-Dalba Award
 1998 : Grand prize of Salon du livre de Toronto
 1996 : Comar Jury Special Prize
 1995 : Grand Prix of the city of Sfax
 1994 : France-Canada Award

Honorary degrees
 2003 : Laurentian University
 1993 : Chulalongkorn University
 1988 : American Academy of Arts and Sciences

References

External links
 

1932 births
Canadian literary critics
Canadian male novelists
20th-century Canadian poets
Canadian male poets
21st-century Canadian poets
Fellows of the Royal Society of Canada
Franco-Ontarian people
Living people
Members of the Order of Canada
People from Sfax
Writers from Toronto
Academic staff of York University
Canadian poets in French
Tunisian emigrants to Canada
20th-century Tunisian poets
Tunisian novelists
Canadian novelists in French
20th-century Canadian novelists
21st-century Canadian novelists
Cornell University alumni
20th-century Canadian male writers
21st-century Canadian male writers
Canadian male non-fiction writers
20th-century Tunisian writers
21st-century Tunisian writers
21st-century Tunisian poets